The 1921 NCAA Track and Field Championships was the first NCAA track and field championship.  The event was held at Stagg Field in Chicago, Illinois in June 1921.  The University of Illinois won the team title.

Overview
The 1921 NCAA Track and Field Championships were held at Stagg Field in Chicago on June 17 and 18, 1921.  The University of Illinois won the team championship with  points.  Notre Dame finished in second place.

Gus Pope of the University of Washington was the individual points leader with 10 points earned through first-place finishes in both the shot put and the discus.

Results

Team standings
Note: Top 10 only
 (H) = Hosts
 Full results

Individual titles, by team

Track events

100-yard dash
Leonard Paulu, Grinnell – 10 seconds
Hayes, Notre Dame
Smith, Nebraska
Wilson, Iowa
Hurley, Washington

120-yard high hurdles
Earl Thomson, Dartmouth - 14.4 seconds (tied his own world record)
Crawford
Anderson, Minnesota
Wynn, Notre Dame
Couglan, University of the South

220-yard dash
1. Eric Wilson, Iowa - 22.6 seconds 
2. Smith, Nebraska 
3. Leonard Paulu, Grinnell 
4. Hayes, Notre Dame 
5. Jing, Ohio

220-yard low hurdles
1. Gus Desch, Notre Dame - 24.8 seconds 
2. Kollin, Wisconsin 
3. Frazier, Baylor 
4. Wallace, Illinois 
5. Wynn, Notre Dame

440-yard dash
1. Frank Shea, Pittsburgh - 49 seconds
2. Butler, Michigan
3. Donohoe, Illinois
4. Pratt, Washington
5. Johnson, Wisconsin

Half-mile run
1. Earl Eby, Penn - 1:57.4
2. Higgins, Ames
3. Nash, Wisconsin
4. Yates, Illinois
5. Donohoe, Illinois

One-mile run
1. Ray Watson, Kansas Aggies - 4:23.4
2. McGinnis, Illinois
3. Sweitzer, Minnesota
4. Ferguson, Ohio State
5. Graham, Ames

Two-mile run
1. John Romig, Penn State - 9:31 
2. Wharton, Illinois 
3. Rathbun, Ames 
4. Canton, St. Olafs 
5. Finkle, Wisconsin

Field events

Broad jump
1. Gaylord Stinchcomb, Ohio State - 23 feet,  inches
2. Sward, Knox
2. Osborn, Illinois
4. Sundt, Wisconsin
5. Alberts, Illinois

High jump 
1. Johnny Murphy, Notre Dame - 6 feet, 3 inches
2. Alberts, Illinois 
3. Hoffman, Iowa 
4. Frankland, Washington 
4. Osborne, Illinois

Pole vault 
1. Longino Welch, Georgia Tech - 12 feet
1. Eldon Jenne, Washington State - 12 feet
1. Lloyd Wilder, Wisconsin - 12 feet
1. R. Gardner, Yale - 12 feet
5. Merrick, Wisconsin
5. Hogan, Notre Dame

Discus throw
1. Gus Pope, Washington - 142 feet,  inches 
2. Blackwood, Northwestern
3. Praeger, Kalamazoo
4. Duke Slater, Iowa
5. Weiss, Illinois

Javelin
1. Flint Hanner, Stanford - 191 feet, 2-l/4 inches 
2. Tuck, Oregon 
3. Hoffman, Michigan 
4. Mahan, Texas A&M 
5. Oberst, Notre Dame

Shot put
1. Gus Pope, Washington - 45 feet,  inches
2. Dale, Nebraska
3. Weiss, Illinois
4. Lindsay, Rice
5. Shaw, Notre Dame

Hammer throw 
1. Charles Redmon, Chicago - 133 feet  inches
2. Blackwood, Northwestern
3. Duke Slater, Iowa
4. Skidmore, University of Southern Illinois

See also
 NCAA Men's Outdoor Track and Field Championship

References

NCAA Men's Outdoor Track and Field Championship